Fording Canadian Coal Trust (NYSE: FDG; TSX:FDG) was a Canadian-based royalty trust which owned a 60% stake in the Elk Valley Coal Partnership (EVCP), which in turn produced hard-coking metallurgical coal, primarily for steel production, at its facility in Elk Valley, British Columbia. Through the EVCP it also owned a 46% interest in Neptune Bulk Terminals (Canada) Ltd., which operates a dedicated coal berth at the Port of Vancouver. Its market capitalization was $11-billion USD in 2008.

The trust was formed in 2003 to assemble various assets from Luscar Ltd./CONSOL Energy Canada Ltd. joint ventures, Teck Cominco Ltd., and the former Fording Coal Ltd. (which was originally a unit of Canadian Pacific Railway until October 2001).

On July 29, 2008, Teck Cominco announced an agreement with Fording to purchase 100% of its assets; Teck Cominco had been the minority owner of the Elk Valley Coal Partnership, with a 40% stake. The purchase was closed on October 30, 2008, with a final cost of $14-billion USD to Teck. Elk Valley Coal Corporation will be renamed Teck Coal Limited.

References

External links
 Fording website (Feb. 2, 2008 snapshot from the Internet Archive)
 Elk Valley Coal website (Jan. 13, 2008 snapshot from the Internet Archive)

Coal companies of Canada
Royalty trusts
Energy companies established in 2003
Non-renewable resource companies established in 2003
Teck Resources